The WAFF Women's Futsal Championship is the West Asian Football Federation's futsal championship for women.

Summary

Participating associations by debut

Overall team records
Teams are ranked by total points, then by goal difference, then by goals scored.

Comprehensive team results by tournament
Legend
 – Champions
 – Runners-up
 – Third place (not determined after 1993)
 – Fourth place (not determined after 1993)
 – Semi-finals (since 1995)
 – Quarter-finals (since 2009)
GS – Group stage
Q – Qualified for upcoming tournament
 – Did not qualify
 – Did not enter / Withdrew / Banned
 – Hosts

For each tournament, the number of teams in each finals tournament (in brackets) are shown.

Performance by nations 

* as hosts

See also 
WAFF Women's Championship
WAFF Futsal Championship

References

External links
2008 WAFF Women's Futsal Championship results
2012 2nd WAFF Futsal Championship for Women

 
Women's international futsal competitions
Futsal competitions in Asia